Sarcocalirrhoe is a genus of parasitic flies in the family Tachinidae.

Species
Sarcocalirrhoe trivittata (Curran, 1925)
Sarcocalirrhoe zuercheri Townsend, 1928

References

Dexiinae
Diptera of South America
Taxa named by Charles Henry Tyler Townsend
Tachinidae genera